Emails I Can't Send is the fifth studio album by American singer and songwriter Sabrina Carpenter, released on July 15, 2022 by Island Records. It is Carpenter's first studio album with the label. The album spawned five singles"Skinny Dipping", "Fast Times", "Vicious", "Because I Liked a Boy" and "Nonsense". Carpenter embarked on the Emails I Can't Send Tour in September 2022, in support of the album. The album ranked 44th overall in Rolling Stones list of the 100 Best Albums of 2022. On the Billboard 200, it peaked at number 23 and became her highest charting album on the chart. The album's fifth single, "Nonsense", became her second entry on the Billboard Hot 100, debuting at number 75.

Background and release 

By June 2019, while promoting her fourth studio album Singular: Act II, Marie Claire magazine reported that Carpenter had begun work on a fifth studio album. In 2020, she released "Honeymoon Fades" and songs intended to support her acting career such as "Let Me Move You" for Work It and the Clouds soundtrack. In January 2021, Carpenter was signed to Island Records, after four albums with Hollywood Records and released "Skin". The track debuted at number 48 on the Billboard Hot 100, becoming her first entry on the chart.

Carpenter reported to Teen Vogue in September 2021 that many of the album's songs were written from emails she wrote to herself, such as the song she shared on August 7 with the description "intro", later revealed as the title track of the album. She also revealed that she finished the album's recording in New York with Julia Michaels, JP Saxe, John Ryan and Leroy Clampitt, after she moved to Manhattan's Financial District, in June 2021. Carpenter confirmed on The Tonight Show Starring Jimmy Fallon that the album would be dropped sometime in 2022 and that the title was hidden in work released the year before. The album's name clue was in the music video for "Skinny Dipping", in a shot where the name appears in a Scrabble game.

On March 9, 2023, Carpenter announced a deluxe edition of the album titled Emails I Can't Send Fwd:. It was released on March 17, 2023.

Singles 
"Skinny Dipping" was released as the album's lead single on September 9, 2021. "Fast Times" was released as the album's second single on February 18, 2022. "Vicious" was released as the third single on July 1, 2022, along with the album's pre-order. "Because I Liked a Boy" was released as the fourth single on July 15, 2022, along with the album and its music video. A music video for "Nonsense" was released on November 10, 2022, which was later confirmed by Carpenter to be the fifth single from the album.

Promotion 
On August 30, 2022, Carpenter performed the album's fourth single "Because I Liked a Boy" on The Late Late Show with James Corden.

Tour

On August 15, 2022, Carpenter announced that she would embark on her fourth concert tour in support of Emails I Can't Send. The first leg of the tour began on September 29, 2022 in Atlanta, Georgia and concluded on October 20, 2022 in Orlando, Florida.

On December 12, 2022, Carpenter announced a second North American leg of the tour for the spring of 2023.

Critical reception 

Liam Hess of Vogue stated that the album is "the most fully realized vision of Carpenter the musician—and the most rounded portrait of Carpenter the human being—yet."

Year-end lists

Commercial performance 
Emails I Can't Send debuted at number 23 on the US Billboard 200, with 18,000 album-equivalent units earned, which consisted 7,000 pure album copies, making it Carpenter's highest entry on the chart, as well as number 55 on the Canadian Albums Chart, her second and highest entry on that chart. The album debuted at number 76 on the UK Albums Chart, making it Carpenter's first entry on the chart.

In Australia, the album debuted at number 44 on the ARIA Albums Chart. It tied Evolution as Carpenter's highest-charting album in the country. In New Zealand, Emails I Can't Send debuted at number 27 on the chart, Carpenter's first entry on the chart.

Track listing 

Notes
  signifies a vocal producer

Personnel 
Credits adapted from the liner notes of Emails I Can't Send.

Recorded, mixed and mastering
 Edgewater, New Jersey (Sterling Sound)
 Tarzana, California (Chumba Meadows)
 Los Angeles, California (Henson Recording Studios, Legacy Towers, cmd studios)
 New York City (Jungle City Studios)
 Virginia Beach, Virginia (MixStar Studios)
 Malibu, California (Woodshed Studios)
 Rhinebeck, New York (The Clubhouse)

Vocals
 Sabrina Carpenter – vocals (all tracks), backing vocals (6, 10)
 Julia Michaels – backing vocals (6)
 Steph Jones – backing vocals (8–9)
 Alida Garpestad Peck – backing vocals (11)
 John Ryan – backing vocals (6, 10)
 JP Saxe – backing vocals (6)

Instrumentation
 Crystal Alforque – violin (3)
 Julian Bunetta – bass, drums, keyboards, percussion (8)
 Leroy Clampitt – bass, guitar, drums (3, 11–12), percussion (3, 8, 11–12), keyboards (3, 8, 11), mellotron, synths (3), lap steel (12)
 Noah Conrad – trumpet (11)
 Jason Evigan – guitar, bass, synth (2)
 Peter Lee Johnson – strings (10)
 Forest Miller – strings (8)
 Jorgen Odegard – bass, drums, keyboards, percussion (4)
 John Ryan – bass, guitar, drums, percussion, keyboards (10)
 JP Saxe – keyboards (1), guitar (4, 7, 11), bass (4)
 Alex Sutton – guitar (4)
 Yi-Mei Templeman – cello (11)

Production
 Julian Bunetta – production (8–9)
 Leroy Clampitt – production (1, 3, 8, 11–12)
 Jason Evigan – production, vocal production (2)
 Ryan Marrone – production (7)
 Jorgen Odegard – production (4)
 John Ryan – production (5–6, 10, 13)

Technical
 Bryce Bordone – mix engineer (5, 10)
 Julian Bunetta – recording, programming (8–9)
 Leroy Clampitt – recording (1, 3, 8, 11–12), mixing (1), programming (3, 8, 11–12), string arranging (3)
 Jason Evigan – recording, programming (2)
 Chris Gehringer – mastering (1, 3–4, 6–7, 9–13)
 Şerban Ghenea – mixing (5, 10)
 Josh Gudwin – mixing (2–4, 6–9, 11–13)
 Ryan Marrone – recording (7)
 Jorgen Odegard – recording (4)
 Will Quinnell – mastering (2, 5, 8)
 Jackson Rau – recording (2)
 John Ryan – recording (5–6, 10, 13), programming (5–6, 13)
 Heidi Wang – mix engineer (2–4, 6–9, 12–13)

Charts

Release history

References 

2022 albums
Sabrina Carpenter albums
Island Records albums